Marievale Bird Sanctuary is a protected area in Gauteng, South Africa. It is about 15 km2 in size, and situated on the East Rand on the southern half of the Blesbokspruit wetland, a Ramsar site. The Blesbokspruit is a major perennial river in Gauteng which is flanked by extensive floodplains on either side. Nearby is the Suikerbosrand Nature Reserve.

History 
In 1978, a reserve 524 ha in extent was established. This was further extended to 1,526.01 ha.

Biodiversity 
The Blesbokspruit wetland, in which the sanctuary is situated, is designated as an Important Bird Area. Almost 300 bird species frequent the wetland, according to the Wildlife and Environment Society of South Africa (WESSA), with the best time to visit being between spring and the start of summer.

Birds 
Birds found at the wetland include:

 African grass owl
 African spoonbill
 Baird’s sandpiper
 Baillon’s crake
 Black egret
 Black heron
 Black-winged pratincole
 Black-tailed godwit
 Buff-breasted sandpiper
 Caspian tern
 Curlew sandpiper
 Ethiopian snipe
 Fulvous duck
 Great white heron
 Goliath heron
 Marsh owl
 Pectoral sandpiper
 Purple heron
 Red-chested flufftail
 Sand martin
 Red-knobbed coot
 Reed cormorant
 South African shelduck
 Slaty egret
 Squacco heron
 Yellow wagtail
 Yellow-billed duck

Mammals 

In addition to birds, mammals have also been observed in the sanctuary:

 Blesbok
 Cape clawless otter
 Three species of mongoose
 Southern reedbuck
 Cape hare

Vegetation 
Within the wetland phragmites, typha and juncus reeds can be found between the water pans. A grassland biome occurs near the eastern border.

Activities 
Access to the reserve costs R35pp and R25 per car. There is a conference centre and 2 chalets in the sanctuary. There are four bird hides at the water pans (named Flamingo, Hadeda, Duiker and Shelduck) and a public picnic site in the reserve.

Threats 
The flow of the Blesbokspruit has been hampered by the surrounding industries, i.e. gold mine tailings, sewage treatment plants, farmland expansion and urban development in some parts of the wetland, creating disjointed pans of water in the wetland. Previously the river had few reed beds and few open stretches of shallow water. With the profusion of vegetation like sedges, bulrushes, duckweed and reeds, and the dumping of several large sand embankments through urban expansion, the landscape has since changed, resulting in the reduction of suitable habitat on the river.

Gallery

References

External links
 

Bird sanctuaries of South Africa
Protected areas of Gauteng